The 1988 Hungarian Grand Prix was a Formula One motor race held on 7 August 1988 at the Hungaroring, Mogyoród, Pest, Hungary. It was the tenth race of the 1988 Formula One World Championship.

The 76-lap race was won from pole position by Brazilian driver Ayrton Senna, driving a McLaren-Honda, with French teammate Alain Prost second and Belgian Thierry Boutsen third in a Benetton-Ford. The win, Senna's sixth of the season, moved him level on points with Prost at the top of the Drivers' Championship.

Report

Qualifying
The tight and twisty Hungaroring offered a chance for the naturally-aspirated cars against the turbos, and they took seven of the top ten positions in qualifying. However, Ayrton Senna still took pole position in his McLaren-Honda, his eighth of the season, pipping the Williams of Nigel Mansell by 0.1 seconds. Mansell was driving against doctor's orders as he had developed chickenpox. On the second row of the grid were Thierry Boutsen in the Benetton and Ivan Capelli in the March, and on the third row were Alessandro Nannini in the second Benetton and Riccardo Patrese in the second Williams. Senna's teammate Alain Prost could only manage seventh, while Gerhard Berger was ninth in his Ferrari, the two separated by the second March of Maurício Gugelmin. Completing the top ten was Alex Caffi in the Dallara.

Race

Mansell made a good start and almost took the lead but Senna held onto his position, and thanks to the superior power of his Honda engine he pulled away slightly down the main straight to head the field into turn 1. Patrese also made an excellent start climbing from 6th to 3rd while Prost was slow away and was only 9th at the end of the first lap. Capelli made a great start and in fact almost overtook Mansell into the first turn before his engine suddenly went sour and he pitted after just 2 laps to have a serious misfire investigated. On lap 12, Mansell lost downforce running close behind the McLaren and spun down to 4th place, leaving Senna to fend off the attacks of the other Williams, that of Patrese. The Italian later dropped back with engine problems, while similar problems were afflicting Nannini.

On lap 32, Prost had climbed to 3rd place behind Senna and Boutsen. On lap 37, Mansell pitted to replace tyres, which were ragged and causing vibrations to the car. Prost passed Boutsen on lap 47 and set out chasing down Senna. Two laps later, while Senna prepared to lap Yannick Dalmas' Lola and Gabriele Tarquini's Coloni, Prost passed all three of them in a breathtaking move down the main straight. However he was too quick going into the first turn and ran wide enabling Senna to regain the lead. Prost set the fastest lap of the race but was forced to drop back with vibrations caused by a loose wheel bearing. On lap 58 Mansell retired still feeling the effects of chickenpox. He later admitted that racing in Hungary was a mistake as he was then forced to miss the next two races. Boutsen closed on Prost, but the Frenchman pressed on and pushed Senna. Just half a second covered the two McLarens as they crossed the line. Boutsen took the third spot on the podium, unable to challenge further due to a broken exhaust. Berger, Gugelmin and Patrese completed the points scorers.

Classification

Pre-qualifying

Qualifying

Race

Championship standings after the race

Drivers' Championship standings

Constructors' Championship standings

References

Hungarian Grand Prix
Hungarian Grand Prix
Grand Prix
Hungarian Grand Prix